Bhrikuti Pulp and Paper (officially known as Bhrikuti Paper and Pulp Nepal (BPPN) Ltd) was a pulp mill and paper mill located in Gaindakot, Nepal.

History 

Bhrikuti Pulp and Paper was established in 1985 under the Companies Act 2021 (Bikram Sambat) with support from the People's Republic of China. It was based in Gaindakot, Nawalparasi District (now part of Nawalpur District). Bhrikuti Pulp and Paper was the first paper company in Nepal.

In 1992, Bhrikuti Pulp and Paper was privatised and since then it had been owned by Golcha Organization. Their major paper buyers were Saja Prakashan, Janak Shiksha Samagri Kendra, and Gorkhapatra. In 2008, workers staged a protest due to "the factory administration had not granted the hiked salary that the government had earmarked for workers". The workers accused the company of ignoring their requests and stopped working until the matter was resolved. In 2011, Bhrikuti Pulp and Paper was closed permanently.

References 

Pulp and paper companies of Nepal
Defunct pulp and paper companies
1985 establishments in Nepal
2011 disestablishments in Nepal
Buildings and structures in Nawalpur District